The 2020–21 Alabama Crimson Tide women's basketball team represented the University of Alabama during the 2020–21 NCAA Division I women's basketball season. The Crimson Tide, led by eighth-year head coach Kristy Curry, played their home games at Coleman Coliseum and competed as members of the Southeastern Conference (SEC).

In the December 16 win against Nicholls State, senior Jasmine Walker scored her 1,000th career point, making her the 30th in the program to do so.

The Crimson Tide ended their season at 17–10 (8–8 SEC), receiving an at-large bid to the NCAA tournament, losing in the second round to Maryland.

Departures

Roster

Preseason

SEC media poll
The SEC media poll was released on November 17, 2020.

Schedule

|-
!colspan=9 style=| Non-conference regular season

|-
!colspan=9 style=| SEC regular season

|-
!colspan=9 style=| SEC Tournament

|-
!colspan=9 style=| NCAA tournament

References

Alabama Crimson Tide women's basketball seasons
Alabama
Alabama Crimson Tide
Alabama Crimson Tide
Alabama